Ron Hall (born April 30, 1937) is an American football former safety, he played college football at Missouri Valley College, where he was a 1971 inductee to the school's Athletic Hall of Fame.  As a professional, he played for the  Pittsburgh Steelers of the National Football League (NFL) in 1959 and for the Boston Patriots of the American Football League (AFL) from 1961 to 1967. He was an AFL All-Star in 1963 and a member of the Patriots' All-Decade 1960s Team. His 11 interceptions during the 1964 season (3 interceptions in a game against San Diego) set a single-season Patriots record (12-game season) which in 2022 has not been broken. In 1995 he was named to the New England Patriots' 35th Anniversary team. In 2012 he was inducted into the NAIA Athletic Hall of Fame and in 2017 Ron was inducted into the Missouri Sports Hall of Fame.

Ron taught physical education in the Liberty, Missouri,  School District for over 30 years, coaching football for 15 years and golf for 15 years. He and his wife, Jayne, have 3 children and have been married for 59 years.

See also
 List of American Football League players

References

1937 births
Living people
American football safeties
Boston Patriots players
Pittsburgh Steelers players
Missouri Valley Vikings football players
American Football League All-Star players
People from Granite City, Illinois
Players of American football from Illinois
American Football League players